In computational mathematics, the Lax–Wendroff theorem, named after Peter Lax and Burton Wendroff, states that if a conservative numerical scheme for a hyperbolic system of conservation laws converges, then it converges towards a weak solution.

See also
 Lax–Wendroff method
 Godunov's scheme

References
 Randall J. LeVeque, Numerical methods for conservation laws, Birkhäuser, 1992 

Numerical differential equations
Computational fluid dynamics
Theorems in analysis